Frickley is a village in South Yorkshire, England.

Frickley may refer to:

 Frickley railway station, South Yorkshire, England
 Frickley Colliery, near South Elmsall, West Yorkshire, England
 Frickley Colliery Brass Band, West Yorkshire, England
 Frickley Athletic F.C., a football club that grew out of the colliery

See also 
 Fricker
 Fricke